Betty Nansen (née Betty Anna Maria Müller) (19 March 1873 – 15 March 1943) was a Danish actress and theatre director of the theater that carries her name, the Betty Nansen Theatre.

Biography
She was born on 19 March 1873.

She had her debut in the fall of 1893 in Copenhagen's Casino Theater as the title character in Victorien Sardou's Dora. She went on to play Magda in Hermann Sudermann's Homeland as well as the title character in Alexandre Dumas' The Lady of the Camellias. In the fall of 1896 she changed to the Royal Danish Theatre, where she had her debut as Martha in Ibsen's The Pillars of Society.

In 1913 to 1916, she went to the United States to try to make a career as a movie actress. She starred in a number of unsuccessful films by J. Gordon Edwards, e.g. Anna Karenina (which is now considered lost) The Song of Hate, Should a Mother Tell, A Woman's Resurrection, and The Celebrated Scandal.

After this failed attempt at movie stardom, she took over management of the Alexandra Theatre in Frederiksberg, which she went on to rename the Betty Nansen Theatre. She managed the theatre for 26 seasons until her death in 1943.

In 1896, she married the writer, journalist and director of Gyldendal, Peter Nansen (1861–1918). Her second marriage was to the actor Henrik Bentzon.

She died on 15 March 1943, just 4 days shy of her 70th birthday.

Filmography

References

External links

 Betty Nansen Theatret (The Betty Nansen Theatre)
Manuscript on Betty Nansen, undated, held by the Billy Rose Theatre Division, New York Public Library for the Performing Arts

1873 births
1943 deaths
Danish stage actresses
Danish silent film actresses
20th-century Danish actresses
Danish film actresses
Danish theatre directors
Danish expatriates in the United States